Rochelle Mercedes Garza (born 1984/1985) is a civil rights attorney who practices family law, criminal defense, Immigration law, constitutional law and is the president of the Texas Civil Rights Project.

Early life and education

Garza was raised in Brownsville, Texas. Both of her parents were public school teachers. Her father became a teacher, a lawyer and then served South Texas as an elected State District Judge for 21 years. Garza earned her Bachelor of Arts degree with honors from Brown University in 2007, her Juris Doctor from University of Houston Law Center in 2013 and a master's degree in public health from the University of Texas Health Science Center at Houston (UTHealth) in 2015. .

Career

Garza was a staff attorney for the ACLU. Garza became a managing partner of Garza & Garza Law, PLLC. Garza was a board member at Moody Clinic (January 2018 – January 2020), Director of the Cameron County Bar Association (May 2018 – December 2021), Chair at the Ethics Advisory Committee, City of Brownsville, Texas (January 2021 – July 2021) and a board member at Jane's Due Process since February 2019. On January 26, 2023, Garza was announced as president of the Texas Civil Rights Project, a civil rights litigation and advocacy organization for voting rights, immigration and criminal justice work.

Attorney General election

In 2022, Garza was the Texas Democratic Party nominee for Attorney General. In the primary election, Mike Fields, an attorney and former judge of the Harris County Criminal Court at Law No. 14 (endorsed Garza in runoff), Lee Merritt, a civil rights attorney (endorsed Garza in runoff) and S. T-Bone Raynor, attorney were all eliminated in the primary. Garza and Joe Jaworski, an attorney, mediator, former mayor of Galveston, and grandson of former U.S. Department of Justice special counsel Leon Jaworski advanced to a runoff election. Garza won the runoff election, becoming the first Latina nominee for Texas attorney general.

Garza lost in the general election to Republican Ken Paxton. Garza received 43.7%, 3,482,909 votes while Paxton received 53.4%, 4,268,826 votes.

Notable cases 

Garza represented a 17-year-old woman who came to the United States without her parents who resided in a government-funded shelter in Texas. The Trump administration would not allow her to leave the shelter to get an abortion.

Personal life

Garza grew up in a Catholic household. According to her mother, she was crowd-surfed to Pope John Paul II at eight months old and blessed by the Pope. Her brother, Robby, experienced a brain injury during childbirth that resulted in disabilities and he died before she went to college.

References

Texas lawyers
Texas Democrats
1980s births
Living people
Brown University alumni
University of Houston Law Center alumni
University of Texas Health Science Center at Houston alumni